Wayne Lemon is an American playwright and screenwriter.

Career
Lemon's theatrical work has been performed by Steppenwolf Theatre Company, South Coast Repertory, Hartford Stage and The Denver Centre for the Performing Arts, among others.

His plays have been featured in Hartford Stage's Brand: NEW Fall Festival of Plays, Horizon Theatre Company's New South Playworks, New Haarlem Arts Theatre's Unheard Voices for the American Theater, the Alabama Shakespeare Festival's Southern Writers' Project and the American National Theatre.  His darkly comic work Jesus Hates Me was chosen as the inaugural production of the Denver Center Theatre Company's New Play Summit.

Lemon began his career as a theatre critic for the Austin Chronicle.  Lemon has been a guest lecturer at The University of Michigan, The University of Georgia, Marquette University, George Washington University, Texas Tech University and the University of Texas.  He has served as playwright in residence at theaters across America.

Other theatrical works include 8 feet of water, Drive By and Buddy Sharp.

Lemon currently writes for the motion picture industry in Los Angeles.  Recent projects include Master Thieves (based on the book by Stephen Kurkjian) and The Presidents Club (based on the book by Nancy Gibbs and Michael Duffy) for Sony Pictures Entertainment with Matt Tolmach producing.  Lemon's debut screenplay, The Havana Affair, was named to the industry's 2015 Hit List as well as 2016's Young & Hungry List before being set up at Leonardo DiCaprio's Appian Way and  Tobey Maguire's Material Pictures.

Critical response to Jesus Hates Me 
Lemon has hit upon a genre as irreverent and at times as profane as rap, yet filled with pertinent issues and rebellious politics.--Variety

[This] irreverent dramedy about the search for meaning may offend as often as it convulses.  Lemon's narrative is both wildly inappropriate and keenly idiomatic.  There's a compassionate point beneath its quirky corrosion.--Los Angeles Times

Lemon is a keen observer of human flaws and frailties, skillfully merging dozens of minute details to form a seriocomic mosaic.  Up close, much of it is pointedly funny.  From a distance, it's sickly-sad.--Orange County Register

Though Jesus Hates Me does have its occasional sweet moments, it's the acidic ones that make it such a treat.--StageSceneLA

Jesus Hates Me questions faith by confronting social taboos, everything from racism to blasphemy, fraud to adultery, suicide to incest — all through a lens of dark humor.--San Diego Reader

An exquisite comedy, featuring black lines of intriguing thought, with some of the funniest dialogue ever heard.  Lemon has done an amazing piece of work.--Back Stage

Jesus Hates Me is a character study, a comedy, a dramatic statement, a fleeting discourse on religion, an exploration of belief, a brief treatise on predestination versus self-determination and a whole lot of fun.  It is alive as few plays are.--Centerstage

This irreverent take on the search for meaning is hilarious, poignant, heartfelt, and a deeply vivid portrait of lives teetering on the edge of something big.--KPBS Arts

Lemon's comic touch is razor sharp.--San Diego Union-Tribune

External links
 Tracking Board:  Leonardo DiCaprio and Tobey Maguire Producing Spy Thriller The Havana Affair
 Movie Insider:  The Havana Affair
 Tracking Board:  The Young and Hungry List 2016
 The Wrap: ‘Narcos’ Director Jose Padilha to Develop ‘Master Thieves’ at Sony
 Playbill
 Variety: Denver Remounts New Play Plan
 Denver Center Theatre Company:  Inside OUT, Jesus Hates Me Study Guide

American dramatists and playwrights
American male screenwriters
Screenwriters from Texas
Living people
American male dramatists and playwrights
Year of birth missing (living people)